Slam Creepers were a rock band from Vansbro, Sweden formed by Björn Skifs in 1962 and broke up in 1969. Björn Skifs then went on a solo career. They had some moderate hits including a cover of a Foundations song "We Are Happy People". Skifs would later find success with a number 1 hit "Hooked on a Feeling as a member of Blue Swede.

The name is a humorous anglicisation of Swedish 'slamkrypare', 'mud crawlers', a slang name for a kind of shoes.

Discography

Singles
 "Go On Home Baby" / "Nobody" - Bill BT 106 - 1966
 "Cross A Million Mountains I've Got A Way Of My Own" - Bill BT 110 - 1966
 "You've Lost That Lovin' Feelin'" / "See Saw" -  Bill BT 113 - 1967
 "Funny How Love Can Be" / "En Sång Om Kärlek" - Bill BT 114 - 1967
 "Big Black Piano Too Good To Be Real Bill" BT 118 - 1967
 "Lemon Tree" / "Open The Door To Your Heart" - Bill BT 119 - 1967
 "Joe's Got The Right" / "I Put A Spell On You" - Bill BT 121 - 1967
 "It's Saturday" / "Listen Hold It Baby" - Bill BT 122 - 1968
 "Love A Go Go" / "Vansbro Memories" - Bill BT 123 - 1968
 "Mister Personality Man" / "Cash Box Ladies Behaviour Bill" BT 126 - 1968
 "We Are Happy People" / "I Just Couldn't Get You Out Of My Mind" - Bill BT 128 - 1968
 "Ha Ha Ha" / "Livin' With Lies" - Bill BT 129 - 1968
 "My Horoscope" / "Vi Lever Glada Dagar" - Bill BT 130 1968
 "Land Of Love" / "Sweet Ruth" - Bill BT 136 - 1969
 "Every Bit Of My Life" (Credited to "Björn Skifs" / "Lovey Dovey" - Bill BT 141 - 1969

EP
 "Nobody" / "Good To Me" / "Go On Home Baby" / "Gotta Take The First Plane Home" - Bill BTE 105 - 1966

Albums
Bubbles - Bill BTLP 11 - 1967
Sweet Ruth - Bill BTLP 12 - 1968

References

External links
 Beautiful records SLAM CREEPERS (7")
 Beautiful Records website
 http://www.museumstuff.com/learn/topics/Slam_Creepers::sub::Discography
 Slam Creepers Facebook

Swedish rock music groups
Musical groups established in 1963
Beat groups